The men's singles soft tennis event was part of the soft tennis programme and took place between September 29 and 30, at the Yeorumul Tennis Courts.

Schedule
All times are Korea Standard Time (UTC+09:00)

Results
Legend
WO — Won by walkover

Preliminary round

Group A

Group B

Group C

Group D

Knockout round

References 

Official website

External links 
soft-tennis.org

Soft tennis at the 2014 Asian Games